Cascata do Poço do Bacalhau is a waterfall near Fajã Grande on the Azores island of Flores, Portugal. 
While the waterfall is highly active in the rainy season, during the summer it is reduced to a trickle into the pond below which is used for bathing. The waterfall is fed from the mountains in the centre of the island which are frequently covered in cloud. Eels can be observed in the pond below the falls.

References

Waterfalls of the Azores